Doluca may refer to the following places in Turkey:

 Doluca, Batman, a village in the district of Batman, Batman Province
 Doluca, Çayırlı
 Doluca, Gümüşhacıköy, a village in the district of Gümüşhacıköy, Amasya Province
 Doluca, Kahta, a village in the district of Kahta, Adıyaman Province
 Doluca, Tercan